José Gustavo Angel Ramírez (19 March 1934 – 23 February 2013) was a Colombian Catholic bishop.

Ordained to the priesthood on 7 September 1958, Angel Ramírez was named bishop of the Apostolic Vicariate of Mitú, Colombia on 19 June 1989 and retired on 17 September 2009.

References

1934 births
2013 deaths
People from Antioquia Department
21st-century Roman Catholic bishops in Colombia
20th-century Roman Catholic bishops in Colombia
Roman Catholic bishops of Mitú